Pagiocerus is a genus of crenulate bark beetles in the family Curculionidae. There is at least one described species in Pagiocerus, P. frontalis.

References

Further reading

 
 
 

Scolytinae
Articles created by Qbugbot